Džiugas Bartkus (born 7 November 1989) is a Lithuanian professional footballer who plays as a goalkeeper for Hapoel Ironi Kiryat Shmona in Israel.

Club career
He started his career with FBK Kaunas in 2008. During 2010 and 2011 he was loaned to Belarusian clubs Partizan Minsk and Dinamo Brest.
 
Between season 2012-2015 Džiugas formed part of Sudūva, a club based in the city of Marijampolė, Lithuania, where he made a total of 83 appearances.
 
In July 2016, Džiugas Bartkus joined Valletta FC and signed a one year contract.

Goalkeeper returned to Lithuania on 9 July 2017, when he signed a long-term contract with A Lyga champions Žalgiris.

International career
In 2015, he was called into Lithuania squad for their UEFA Euro 2016 qualifying matches against England and Slovenia.

On 5 June 2018, he made a debut in the Lithuania national team in a 1–1 draw against Latvia in a Baltic Cup final.

References

External links
 
 

1989 births
Living people
Lithuanian footballers
Lithuania international footballers
Lithuanian expatriate footballers
Association football goalkeepers
Sportspeople from Kaunas
FC Partizan Minsk players
FC Dynamo Brest players
FBK Kaunas footballers
FK Sūduva Marijampolė players
Górnik Łęczna players
Valletta F.C. players
FK Žalgiris players
Hapoel Ironi Kiryat Shmona F.C. players
Belarusian Premier League players
A Lyga players
Ekstraklasa players
Maltese Premier League players
Israeli Premier League players
Expatriate footballers in Belarus
Expatriate footballers in Poland
Expatriate footballers in Malta
Expatriate footballers in Israel
Lithuanian expatriate sportspeople in Belarus
Lithuanian expatriate sportspeople in Poland
Lithuanian expatriate sportspeople in Malta
Lithuanian expatriate sportspeople in Israel